This Window was a British musical group formed by Peter Bright around 1985, although earlier tape experiments existed from 1979 to 1984.

Career

These tape experiments formed the basic philosophy of This Window. The analogue tape machine became the main instrument used to create ‘songs’. Interest in experimentation had been nurtured whilst being a member of the Exeter College of Art and Design  bands, T.34 (1978–1980) and The Urge (1979). The Urge supported Adam and the Ants and Bauhaus and were offered a record contract with 4AD but decided to split up and consequently did not sign. In A Glass Darkly (1981) was a project with the lead singer from The Urge, Russell Young (the husband to be of Finola Hughes) and two ballet dancers who performed to a tape backing track of a dripping tap, only a handful of gigs were played in London. This project ended and Peter later joined Finish the Story (1981–1986) as guitarist.

The perfect conduit for This Window’s music and art was the Cassette Culture and Mail Art scenes. These networks of artists and musicians encouraged an early form of open source cooperation, with projects being shared and created. This methodology fitted in with This Window's approach to creativity.

Discography
This Window released two solo cassette albums ('Hope' & 'Jude The Obscure') in the UK and several albums were released in Europe, the most successful being 'Extraction' & 'Extraction2' (1989 & 1995) both of these were released by EE Tapes (Belgium). Other releases include: Ignition Mix on Old Europa Cafe label, 'En Face' (France) and 'Morning' (Germany). This Window were one of the leading exponents of the 'Cassette Underground', with radio play in both Europe and America. Critical acclaim was received from both sides of the Atlantic.

Live performances have been sporadic, a notable one was, the 3rd mail-art festival (1990) at OJC Clichee in Sint-Niklaas. This festival was a multimedia event, a combination of a postal art (Mail Art) exhibition, live music event and live radio show.

After a ten-year gap, a CD was released (together with Finish the Story) in 2005 called 'The Sampler No. 05', which was a collection of old and new material. This CD was received very well in the media and was followed up with two more solo CD-R releases in 2007.

In December 2008, Electro Arc label release ‘Where Is My Jesus’ on their Net.Ware Stimulation compilation album. In January 2009, ‘Cassette Culture 1989–2009’ was released as a commercial download. This project contained remixes of a series of demo recordings made in 2008 and a section of the live Plac.Art.X set that was streamed over the Internet to Regensburg Germany in August 2007. This release also contains a complete remixed version of 'Extraction' which was originally released in 1989. These remixes were by Jake Bright.

Over the years This Window became the pseudonym of Peter Bright.

Articles/Reviews 
Review in German magazine 'Epitaph' 1991, contains list of solo releases from 1988 - 1991 
 Review and interview with the BBC in 2005 about the release of 'The Sampler No. 05'.  There is a link on this page to an audio clip of the interview.
 Review by Mick Mercer:  in 2007
 Review in Grave Jibes Fanzine (Russia) February 2010  pages 64 to 71. This includes an interview and a review of 'Cassette Culture 1989 - 2009'
 Article on early experiences of home taping  from 'The Living Archive Of Underground Music'

Music production 
 Produced the Finish the Story Track on Gunfire and Pianos (SITU 17) released by ZigZag/Situation Two in 1985
 Engineered and remastered The Dancing Did live tracks on Cherry Red Records' release And Did Those Feet
(cdmred320) 2007

External reference 
 List of releases and contributions to the mail art and cassette culture scenes. 
 3rd mail-art festival 1990 at OJC Clichee in Sint-Niklaas contains link to images of performance. 
 Link to the placard headphone festival (le Placard) Plac.Art.X (August 2007). Several artist based in different countries streamed their audio and video over the Internet to  Regensburg, Germany where the audience listened through headphones and watched on video screens.

Trivia 
 The singer songwriter Clifford T. Ward was Peter Bright’s English teacher at North Bromsgrove High School
 Peter Bright helped design and make John Bonham's gravestone
 Peter Bright made page two of The Financial Times on 3 May 2000 with an Internet project InMemoryOf.co.uk 
 Married to the author and TV script writer Veronica Henry

References

British art rock groups
Cassette culture 1970s–1990s